The Johnstown Johnnies were an American basketball team based in Johnstown, Pennsylvania that was a member of the Central Basketball League.

Year-by-year

Basketball teams in Pennsylvania
Defunct basketball teams in the United States
Johnstown, Pennsylvania